Hemicloea is a genus of South Pacific flat spiders that was first described by Tamerlan Thorell in 1870. Originally placed with the ground spiders, it was moved to the Trochanteriidae in 2018.

Species
 it contains thirteen species:
Hemicloea affinis L. Koch, 1875 – Australia (New South Wales)
Hemicloea crocotila Simon, 1908 – Australia (Western Australia)
Hemicloea limbata L. Koch, 1875 – Australia (New South Wales)
Hemicloea michaelseni Simon, 1908 – Australia (Western Australia)
Hemicloea murina L. Koch, 1875 – Australia (Queensland)
Hemicloea pacifica Berland, 1924 – New Caledonia (Loyalty Is.)
Hemicloea plumea L. Koch, 1875 – Australia (Queensland, New South Wales, Lord Howe Is.)
Hemicloea rogenhoferi L. Koch, 1875 – Australia (Queensland, New South Wales), New Zealand
Hemicloea semiplumosa Simon, 1908 – Australia (Western Australia)
Hemicloea sublimbata Simon, 1908 – Australia (Western Australia)
Hemicloea sundevalli Thorell, 1870 (type) – Australia (Queensland, New South Wales), New Zealand
Hemicloea tasmani Dalmas, 1917 – Australia (Tasmania)
Hemicloea tenera L. Koch, 1876 – Australia (Queensland, New South Wales)

References

Araneomorphae genera
Spiders of Australia
Taxa named by Tamerlan Thorell
Trochanteriidae